Atlantic hazelwood is hazel (Corylus avellana) dominated temperate rainforest that occurs on the hyperoceanic western fringe of Europe, in particular on the west coasts of Scotland and Ireland. It is considered to be a type of climax scrub. It occurs in exposed, coastal situations where thin soils and strong winds prevent the establishment of trees.

Historical management
Although the Atlantic hazelwoods would historically have been exploited by people, it is thought that the exploitation was limited to seasonal sheltered grazing of livestock and the selective cutting of hazel poles, with clearcut coppicing believed to be a very marginal activity.

Epiphyte communities
The long ecological continuity of the Atlantic hazelwoods due to their lack of clearcut coppicing, together with the hyperoceanic climate under which they occur and low levels of atmospheric pollution, results in luxuriant growth of epiphytic lichens and bryophytes. 

Two discrete communities of lichens grow on Atlantic hazel. Young, smooth-barked hazel stems are colonised by crustose lichens of the Graphidion, including the very rare Graphis alboscripta. Old, rough-barked stems are colonised by leafy lichens of the Lobarion; a community that is very rare and declining in Europe.

Atlantic hazelwood is also the habitat of the rare fungus hazel gloves (Hypocreopsis rhododendri).

References

External links

 Scottish Natural Heritage: Atlantic Hazel.
 Trees for Life: Scottish Atlantic Hazelwoods.
 Atlantic Hazel Action Group

Trees